The Tennis Championships of Maui (formerly known as the Honolulu Challenger, the Maui Challenger and the Royal Lahaina Challenger) is a professional tennis tournament played on outdoor hard courts. It is currently part of the ATP Challenger Tour. It is held annually in Lahaina, Maui. It was moved from Honolulu to Maui in 2013, and to the Royal Lahaina in 2014. The tournament was included in the ITF Women's Circuit for one year, in 2016.

Past finals

Men's singles

Men's doubles

Women's singles

Women's doubles

References

External links
 Official website

ATP Challenger Tour
Honolulu Challenger
ATP Challengers in Hawaii
Sports in Maui
Recurring sporting events established in 2010
2010 establishments in Hawaii
Lahaina, Hawaii